Michael Browne (12 January 1930 – 20 December 2008) was an Irish Fine Gael politician. He was elected to Dáil Éireann as a Fine Gael Teachta Dála (TD) for the Mayo North constituency at the 1961 general election. He lost his seat at the 1965 general election. He unsuccessfully contested the Mayo East constituency at the 1969 general election.

References

1930 births
2008 deaths
Fine Gael TDs
Members of the 17th Dáil
Politicians from County Mayo